Forgotten Freshness Volume 3 is a rarities album by Insane Clown Posse. Released in 2001, it was notable for being their first release to feature Mike Puwal as a producer rather than Mike E. Clark. It is the group's 3rd installment in the "Forgotten Freshness album series", their 4th compilation album, and their 16th overall release.

Music and lyrics
"Intro" is a real radio commercial from 1994 that promoted the group's "Ringmaster Tour" in Detroit. "Fly Away" was the first song recorded by Zug Izland. A different mix of the song was released on their debut album Cracked Tiles. The song "Run!" was originally created by Insane Clown Posse to test their new producer Mike Puwal's skills. "Nuttin' But a Bitch Thang" was recorded during the group's feud with Eminem. The song itself was a response to Eminem's song "Marshall Mathers" from his The Marshall Mathers LP.

The songs "It" and "Super Star" were recorded and written by Joseph Bruce during a late-night studio session with Mike E. Clark when he was "bored". "The Mom Song" was recorded by Violent J and long-time friend, the Rude Boy, in March 1999, while on "The Amazing Jeckel Brothers Tour". The song was made as a Mother's Day gift for both their mothers. The songs "Cartoon Nightmare" and "Take Me Home" were recorded specifically for Forgotten Freshness Volume 3.

The song "Take It!" was originally written about Satan. Joseph Bruce explains that the song is about having "to watch somebody [he] knew go to Hell and meet the devil." Bruce would have no control over what would happen to his friend, and the only advice he could give would be to "take [whatever punishment the Devil gives]." When the group went to wrestle in World Championship Wrestling, the company asked to use the song for wrestler Vampiro's entrance music. Insane Clown Posse agreed, and added background vocals which said "Vampiro" to make the song be about him.

Track listing

 At the 6:09 mark of "Take Me Home" a bonus track featuring Violent J and Jumpsteady's family members plays

Chart positions

References

Insane Clown Posse compilation albums
2001 compilation albums
Island Records compilation albums